Camp Down is a location at Portsdown Hill, Hampshire, near Farlington, which was used as an Admiralty semaphore station and later as a redoubt on the line of Palmerston Forts, Portsmouth.

The Admiralty Telegraph Station was built at Camp Down in 1821 and it  operated on the semaphore line from London to Portsmouth from 1822 to 1847.

The site is now quarried away.

References

Forts in Hampshire
Redoubts